Damián Iván Batallini (born 24 June 1996) is an Argentine professional footballer who plays as a winger for Necaxa, on loan from Argentinos Juniors.

Club career
Batallini came through the youth ranks of Deportivo Armenio, River Plate and Argentinos Juniors. He made his pro debut for Argentinos in the Argentine Primera División against Tigre on 6 February 2016. Seven matches later, Batallini scored the first goal of his career in a 2–2 draw with Racing Club. He made twelve appearances and scored two goals in a season which ended in relegation to Primera B Nacional. In the second tier, he scored three goals in sixteen games as Argentinos won the title. In December 2020, after over a hundred games for them, Batallini agreed a move to Liga MX side Atlético San Luis.

On 25 January 2022, Batallini joined Independiente on a loan deal for a fee around 250,000 dollars until the end of the year, with a purchase option of 2 millions dollars for 50% of his rights.

International career
Batallini played for the Argentina U15 team under manager Adrián Domenech.

Career statistics

Honours
Argentinos Juniors
Primera B Nacional: 2016–17

Notes

References

External links

1996 births
Living people
Sportspeople from Buenos Aires Province
Argentine footballers
Argentine expatriate footballers
Argentina youth international footballers
Association football forwards
Argentine Primera División players
Primera Nacional players
Liga MX players
Argentinos Juniors footballers
Atlético San Luis footballers
Club Atlético Independiente footballers
Expatriate footballers in Mexico
Argentine expatriate sportspeople in Mexico